Timber Wolf is a wooden roller coaster located at Worlds of Fun in Kansas City, Missouri. Timber Wolf was designed by Curtis D. Summers and was built by the Dinn Corporation. It opened on April 1, 1989.

The ride 
Timber Wolf is one of two wooden roller coasters at Worlds of Fun and Worlds of Fun's first wooden roller coaster. It also included an unusual 560-degree upward-spiraling helix until 2018, when it was replaced with a 70 degree banked turn. Timber Wolf has a sign at its entrance saying "Extreme vibrations and roughness are a nature of this ride. Do not be alarmed."

After World's of Fun's purchase by Cedar Fair in 1995, trim brakes were added to the Timber Wolf's first drop, slowing the ride considerably, similar to the now defunct Mean Streak at Cedar Point and the now defunct Hercules at Dorney Park & Wildwater Kingdom.

Inside the ride's station, there is a "chicken exit" for riders who chicken out in line. It is marked by the sign once used by Orient Express, which was demolished in 2003.

The ride's acclaim is featured in the "History of Roller Coasters" in the Wildcat at Frontier City in Oklahoma City.

Trains 

2 trains with 6 cars per train built by the Philadelphia Toboggan Company. Riders are arranged 2 across in 2 rows for a total of 24 riders per train.

Renovation 
In the 2006/2007 off season Timber Wolf underwent renovation involving extensive wood work. When the new season started, riders reported that the ride was smoother. In addition to the wood work, new faceplates were installed featuring airbrushed original Timber Wolf logos, rather than decals that formerly had to be replaced every couple of years.

In the 2007/2008 off season, Timber Wolf received new air powered queue gates, sporting a new aluminum finish. However, the new gates do not match up with the corresponding numbered car, which can lead to some confusion during the loading process.

More renovation of the coaster was completed in 2010.

In 2018, the helix on Timber Wolf was replaced with a seventy-degree banked turn constructed by Great Coasters International, which manufactured Prowler. From 2006 to 2017, Timber Wolf had been in the process of being retracked by GCI from the lift hill up to the track leading up to the 540-degree upwards-spiraling helix. GCI also retracked Timber Wolf from the banked turn to the brake run. Worlds of Fun also revealed their new, modernized Timber Wolf logo, which is a modernized take on the 1989 logo. The new Timber Wolf reopened on May 18, 2018, for season passholder sneak peek night.

Rankings 
Timber Wolf was voted the world's top roller coaster in the 1991 Inside Track readers survey, and was rated the number one favorite wooden coaster in the 1992 NAPHA survey. However, as the coaster has aged, its ranking in more recent polls has fallen considerably.

Incidents 

On March 31, 1990, 35 people were injured when two roller coaster trains collided just short of the loading platform. The control system malfunctioned, causing the system to be unable to control two trains at once. The ride reopened running a single train until the control system was fixed to handle two trains.
On June 30, 1995, a 14-year-old-girl died after falling from her seat. A riding companion claimed that safety restraints (a lap bar and seat belt) had come undone on a sharp turn at the top of one of the ride's hills. But, Worlds of Fun officials claimed that witnesses had seen her remove her restraints and tried to switch seats and that there had been no malfunction. The park's owners at the time, Hunt Midwest Entertainment Inc., and the makers of the ride eventually settled with the girl's family for $200,000. This made Timber Wolf the only ride so far at Worlds of Fun with a fatality.
On August 2, 2014, an 11-year-old boy was taken to a hospital after suffering a concussion and a bloody nose on the ride. The boy said that as the coaster was descending down the hill, he hit his head & nose on the restraint and therefore had a bloody nose as he was exiting the ride. He had blood all over his shorts according to authorities. Paramedics wrapped the boy's nose with a towel to prevent blood from dripping on his legs and feet.

See also 
Incidents at Cedar Fair parks

References

External links 
Timber Wolf at Worlds of Fun's website
Timber Wolf at the Roller Coaster DataBase

Roller coasters in Missouri
Roller coasters introduced in 1989
Worlds of Fun
Roller coasters operated by Cedar Fair